Giada Franco (born 11 July 1996 Naples) is an Italian rugby union player. She plays Flanker for Rugby Colorno. She is a member of the Italy women's national rugby union team.

Career 
She competed at the 2018 Women's Six Nations Championship,  2019 Women's Six Nations Championship, 2020 Women's Six Nations Championship, 2021 Women's Six Nations Championship, 2021 Rugby World Cup, 2022 Women's Six Nations Championship,

In 2019, she played for Harlequin F.C.

References 

1996 births
Italian rugby union players
Living people